Frank Orum Waddey (August 21, 1905 – October 21, 1990) was a Major League Baseball player. Waddey played in one season, for the St. Louis Browns in the 1931 season. He had six hits, two RBIs and three runs scored in 14 games. He batted and threw left-handed.

An alumnus of the Georgia School of Technology, Waddey was born in Memphis, Tennessee and died in Knoxville, Tennessee. He married Alberta Gilbertson in 1930. He was a member of the Delta Sigma Phi fraternity and the ANAK Society while at Georgia Tech, as well as the varsity baseball and football teams from 1927 to 1929.

See also
List of Georgia Institute of Technology athletes

References

External links

Baseball Almanac

1905 births
1990 deaths
St. Louis Browns players
Major League Baseball outfielders
Baseball players from Tennessee
Knoxville Smokies players
Memphis Chickasaws players
Binghamton Triplets players
Quincy Indians players
Springfield Senators players
Chattanooga Lookouts players
Birmingham Barons players
Omaha Packers players
Council Bluffs Rails players
Georgia Tech Yellow Jackets baseball players
Georgia Tech Yellow Jackets football players
American football ends
All-Southern college football players